Platylobium alternifolium, commonly known as Victorian flat-pea,  is a  shrub species  that is endemic to Victoria, Australia . It is a member of the family Fabaceae and of the genus Platylobium. The species was formally described in 1883 by Victorian Government Botanist Ferdinand von Mueller based on plant material collected at Mount William, Mount Disappointment and Ben Nevis.

References

alternifolium
Fabales of Australia
Flora of Tasmania
Plants described in 1883
Taxa named by Ferdinand von Mueller